Addai Scher Also written Addai Sher, Addaï Scher and Addai Sheir (3 March 1867 – 21 June 1915), an ethnic Assyrian, was the Chaldean Catholic archbishop of Siirt in Upper Mesopotamia. He was killed by the Ottomans during the 1915 Assyrian Genocide.

Early life
Addai was born in Shaqlawa to an ethnic Assyrian family who were adherents of the Chaldean Catholic Church on 3 March 1867. His father was the local priest of the village, and he helped him at teaching Chaldean language at a young age. The early death of his mother made him concentrate on ascetic life and he joined the Dominican Seminar in Mosul in 1880 where he studied Syriac, Chaldean, Arabic, French, Latin and Turkish as well as theology and philosophy. Nine years later he was appointed a priest and sent to his home town Shaqlawa, where he once more worked as a teacher in the Church's school.

Priest and bishop
He was later appointed as a bishopric assistant in Kirkuk and he spent his time learning Hebrew, Greek, Persian, Kurdish and he authored as well in German and English.

On 13 November 1902, he was elected as the next bishop of Siirt, a position that had been vacant for two years.
In 1908 he journeyed to Istanbul where he met the Ottoman Sultan Abdulhamid II. From there he took off to Rome and met pope Pius X, and during his stay in Paris he managed to make contacts with French orientalists and print some of his works.

Death
In 1915, the Ottoman Army was initially defeated in the Caucasus during the World War I, and fearing an internal uprising from its Christian population orders were given to exterminate the Armenian, Greek, Chaldeans, Syriacs, and Assyrians population of Anatolia. Initially Addai Sher managed to bribe the governor of Siirt with 500 pounds of gold in order to save his congregation. This enabled some of the Chaldean  Christians of the city to flee. The bishop himself was helped by a Kurdish Agha who hid him in his house.

Some Kurds, subjects of Osman, Agha of Tanze, chief of the tribes Hadide and Atamissa, great friends of the Archbishop's and protectors of the Christians, disguised him as a Kurd and got him away by a secret door of his residence. For some days he remained with his friend the Kurdish Agha, but an Ottoman regiment learning of his flight, attempted to trace him. Knowing that the Kurd chief had concealed him they summoned him to surrender the Archbishop, set fire to his house, and threatened him with death. The Kurdish Agha fled with his family. The Kurds who remained, tired of the struggle, were obliged to indicate the hiding place of the prelate, whom the soldiers seized and killed with eight shots.

The Archbishop remained hidden for several days, but eventually a band of Kurdish mercenaries who worked with the Ottoman Turkish army discovered his hideout. After being captured, a witness described the last hours of Addai Scher's life:

See also
Seert (Chaldean Diocese)
Assyrian Genocide
Assyrian struggle for independence
Assyrian people
Assyria
Syriac language
Chaldean Catholic Church
Assyrian Church of the East
Toma Audo

References

1867 births
1915 deaths
Chaldean archbishops
Martyred Roman Catholic priests
20th-century Roman Catholic martyrs
People from Shaqlawa
People who died in the Assyrian genocide
Persecution of Christians in the Ottoman Empire